The Chicago Whip (sometimes referred to as simply The Whip) was a militant African-American newspaper in Chicago from 1919 until 1939.

History 

In 1919, William C. Linton became the founding editor and publisher of the paper. Linton unexpectedly fell ill and died in March 1922 after which Joseph Dandridge Bibb (who previously served as a co-editor for the paper) took over. The paper's "Don't Spend Money Where You Can't Work" campaign advocated for the boycott of white-run businesses with racially discriminatory hiring practices, and the campaign led to over 15,000 Chicago blacks securing jobs. The newspaper was The Chicago Defender's contemporary and rival. Within a year of its launch, The Whip had a circulation of 65,000. 185,000 copies of The Defender were in circulation at the time. The whip survived until 1939.

See also 
Newspapers of the Chicago metropolitan area

References 

Defunct African-American newspapers
Defunct newspapers published in Chicago